Ledena dvorana Zibel is an ice hall in Sisak, Croatia. It was opened on January 27, 2018, and has 1 960 seats.

Events

Ice hockey
December 13–15, 2019  Men's olympic qualification preliminary round 2, Group M

Figure skating competition
 December 7–11, 2021 2021 CS Golden Spin of Zagreb
 December 7–10, 2022 2022 CS Golden Spin of Zagreb

Concerts
 Hladno pivo had a concert. 26. October 2018
 S.A.R.S. had a concert. 22. December 2018

See also
 List of indoor arenas in Croatia
 List of indoor arenas in Europe

References

External links
 www.iihf.com
 Golden Spin of Zagreb at the International Skating Union

Indoor arenas in Croatia
Indoor ice hockey venues in Croatia
Buildings and structures in Sisak-Moslavina County
Sports venues completed in 2018
Sisak